The Maine Rebels are a football team in the Independent Women's Football League based in Portland, Maine. Home games are played at Memorial Stadium on the campus of Deering High School. They were formerly known as the Southern Maine Rebels until 2011.

Season-by-season

|-
| colspan="6" align="center" | Southern Maine Rebels (IWFL)
|-
|2004 || 2 || 4 || 1 || X-Team || --
|-
|2005 || 8 || 2 || 0 || 2nd East Mid-Atlantic || Lost Eastern Conference Semifinal (New York)
|-
|2006 || 1 || 7 || 0 || 3rd East Mid-Atlantic || --
|-
|2007 || 0 || 8 || 0 || 3rd East Northeast || --
|-
|2008 || 1 || 7 || 0 || 5th Tier II North Atlantic || --
|-
|2009 || 2 || 6 || 0 || 15th Tier II || --
|-
|2010* || 1 || 7 || 0 || 7th Tier II East Northeast || --
|-
|2011  || 0 || 8  || 0 || 4th  Tier 1 Northeast
|-
|2012  || 0 || 0  || 0 || 4th  Tier 1 Northeast
|-
|2013  || 0 || 8  || 0 || 4th  Tier 3 Northeast
|-
|Totals || 15 || 57 || 1
|colspan="2"| (including playoffs)

* = Current standing

Season schedules

2009

2010

Logo
The logo of the Rebels is reminiscent of the emblem used by the Rebel Alliance and the New Republic from Star Wars.

External links
Southern Maine Rebels official website
IWFL official website

Independent Women's Football League
Sports in Portland, Maine
American football teams in Maine
American football teams established in 2004
2004 establishments in Maine